Marcus Baur (born 10 May 1971) is a German former yacht racer who competed in the 2000 Summer Olympics and in the 2004 Summer Olympics and a trained architectural engineer.

After his active sports career, he developed and managed various companies and developed innovative products as an executive (among others Sailtracks, SAP Sailing Analytics, Sailing Team Germany, Sail Insight, Goalscape Management Software) and acted as an executive producer of the Olympic Sailing World Cup. He is also a member of the Olympic Channel Commission of the International Olympic Committee.

References

External links
 
 
 

1971 births
Living people
German male sailors (sport)
Olympic sailors of Germany
Sailors at the 2000 Summer Olympics – 49er
Sailors at the 2004 Summer Olympics – 49er
Sportspeople from Kiel